Yedi Kule or Yedikule ("Seven Towers" in Turkish) can refer to:

 Yedikule Fortress in Istanbul, Turkey.
 Yedikule neighborhood, where the fortress is located, in the district of Fatih in Istanbul, Turkey.
 Heptapyrgion (Thessaloniki) citadel in Thessaloniki, Greece.
 Theodoros Vardinogiannis Stadium in Heraklion, Crete, is popularly nicknamed "Yedi Kule".